Amy Rider (born 1985) is a Japanese-American actress and film director. She has played roles in several films including Katrina, Mega Shark vs. Kolossus, and Broken Links. She appeared in the television series 24: Conspiracy and Veronica Mars and had a reoccurring role as Alice Valko in the television series The Secret Life of the American Teenager.

Early life
Rider was born in Tokyo, Japan. The majority of Rider's schooling was in Japan; by her estimation, her family moved within the country about 11 different times.

Career
Rider states that she fell into acting because she was looking for an easy "A" so she took a drama class. Rider ended up being cast as the lead in the school play It was the first thing that made her think that acting might be something that she could really put her focus into. Amy Rider's debut was in Head Cases in 2005. Her career would continue with the television series 24: Conspiracy, and she would make a cameo in Without a Trace.  Rider's first film debut was After Midnight: Life Behind Bars in 2006. Amy would later make an appearance in Veronica Mars in 2006 followed up by the film Kissing Cousins in 2008, and Privileged in 2010.

In 2008 Rider had her breakthrough performance playing Alice Valko in the television series The Secret Life of the American Teenager. Rider was a common recurring character throughout the entire series until its finale in 2013. During this time she also had film roles in The Monogamy Experiment and in Mega Shark vs. Kolossus. In 2016 she was cast in the film Broken Links.

Filmography

Film

Television

References

External links
 

1985 births
Living people
21st-century American actresses
American actresses of Japanese descent
American film actresses
American film actors of Asian descent
American stage actresses
American television actresses
People from Tokyo
Japanese emigrants to the United States